The William Shelly School and Annex, also known as the Eberton School, is a historic school building and annex located in West York, York County, Pennsylvania. Built circa 1897, the Shelly Annex was initially designed as a one-room school, but was then enlarged twice between 1898 and 1903 to become a 2 1/2-story, gable roofed brick building which is three bays wide and seven bays deep. Built between 1905 and 1908, the Shelly School was designed in the Italian Renaissance style, and is a two-story brick structure which is nine bays wide and seven bays deep. Completely rebuilt following a fire in 1919, the property was sold in 1960; the buildings were then utilized as storage facilities for the next 37 years.

It was added to the National Register of Historic Places in 2001.

History and architectural features
The William Shelly School and Annex, which was built circa 1897  in West York, Pennsylvania and is also known as the Eberton School, was initially designed as a one-room school. Enlarged twice between 1898 and 1903, the annex became a 2 1/2-story, gable roofed brick building which is three bays wide and seven bays deep. Built between 1905 and 1908, the Shelly School was designed in the Renaissance Revival style, and is a two-story brick structure which is nine bays wide and seven bays deep. Completely rebuilt following a fire in 1919, the property was sold in 1960; the buildings were then utilized as storage facilities for the next 37 years.

Placement of this school on the National Register of Historic Places
The NRHP nomination application for the William Shelly School and Annex was formally reviewed by Pennsylvania's Historic Preservation Board at its March 13, 2001 meeting at 9:45 a.m. at the State Museum in Harrisburg. Also considered for NRHP status at this time were the: Protection of the Flag Monument in Athens, Pennsylvania; Normandy Farm, George K. Heller School and Upper Roxborough Historic District in Montgomery County; Awbury Historic District and Harris/Laird, Schober & Company Building in Philadelphia; Michael Derstine Farmstead in Bucks County; Chester Heights Camp Meeting Historic District in Delaware County; John Nicholas and Elizabeth Moyer House in Berks County; and the Zeta Psi Fraternity House in Northampton County.

References

School buildings on the National Register of Historic Places in Pennsylvania
Romanesque Revival architecture in Pennsylvania
School buildings completed in 1908
Buildings and structures in York County, Pennsylvania
National Register of Historic Places in York County, Pennsylvania
1908 establishments in Pennsylvania